Anthony "T. J." DiLeo (born 22 June 1990) is a retired American-German professional basketball player who played professionally for the Giessen 46ers and the Telekom Baskets Bonn of the Basketball Bundesliga (BBL). He retired from playing in 2021 and joined the NBA's Philadelphia 76ers as a player development coach heading into the 2021–22 season.

Playing career
DiLeo played five seasons for the Temple Owls, redshirting his freshman year after suffering a season-ending injury five games into the team's season. He played in 126 career games and four NCAA Tournaments for the Owls, averaging 2.3 points, 1.5 rebounds, and one assist per game.

After his redshirt freshman season DiLeo participated in the 2010 FIBA Europe Under-20 Championship as a member of the German National team, averaging 10.7 points per game (second-best on the team) as Germany finished 14th overall.

Gießen 46ers
After completing his college career at Temple, DiLeo signed with the Gießen 46ers of the German ProA league in 2013. He played in 76 games for the 46ers over the course of three seasons as the team moved up to the top tier Basketball Bundesliga (BBL).

Telekom Baskets Bonn
DiLeo signed with Telekom Baskets Bonn in 2016. In 2017, he signed an extension to stay with the team until 2019 after averaging 5.1 points and 3.1 assists per game in EuroCup competition. DiLeo was selected as a reserve for the national team in the 2018 BBL All-Star Game. DiLeo was named a reserve for a second straight All-Star Game in 2019. DiLeo retired after the 2020–21 season.

Coaching 
DiLeo kicked off his coaching career in 2021 as a player development coach for the NBA's Philadelphia 76ers.

Personal life
DiLeo is the son of former NBA coach and executive Tony DiLeo and former German Olympic basketball player Anna DiLeo. His younger brother, Max, played college basketball at Monmouth and currently also plays in the BBL for the Hamburg Towers.

References

External links
 FIBA Europe Cup Profile
 
 College Statistics
 Eurobasket.com Profile
 RealGM Profile

1990 births
Living people
American expatriate basketball people in Germany
American men's basketball players
Basketball players from New Jersey
Cinnaminson High School alumni
German men's basketball players
German people of American descent
Giessen 46ers players
People from Cinnaminson Township, New Jersey
Shooting guards
Sportspeople from Burlington County, New Jersey
Telekom Baskets Bonn players
Temple Owls men's basketball players